Thruscross is a small settlement and civil parish in the Harrogate district of North Yorkshire, England. The parish includes Thruscross Reservoir and a large area of moorland west of the reservoir.

Thruscross was historically a township in the ancient parish of Fewston.  The township included the hamlets of Bramley Head, West End and Low Mill, and in the 19th century there were several flax mills in the township.  It became a separate civil parish in 1866.  The population of the parish is estimated at 90.

Thruscross Reservoir was constructed in the 1960s, and flooded the hamlet of West End.

References

External links 

Civil parishes in North Yorkshire